is a passenger railway station located in the town of Ichinomiya, Chiba Prefecture Japan, operated by the East Japan Railway Company (JR East).

Lines

Station layout
The station consists of a single island platform and a single side platform serving three tracks, connected to a white-washed station building by an footbridge. The station has a Midori no Madoguchi staffed ticket office.

Platform

History
On 1 September 1907, the Bōsō Railway was nationalized and became part of the Japanese Government Railways, which was transformed into the Japan National Railways (JNR) after World War II. The station name was changed to the present name on 1 January 1917. Freight operations were discontinued on 1 July 1971. The station was absorbed into the JR East network upon the privatization of the Japan National Railways on 1 April 1987.

Passenger statistics
In fiscal year 2019, the station was used by an average of 2,976 passengers daily (boarding passengers only).

Surrounding area
 
 Chiba Prefectural Ichinomiya Commercial High School

See also
 List of railway stations in Japan

References

External links

 JR East Station information  

Railway stations in Japan opened in 1899
Railway stations in Chiba Prefecture
Sotobō Line
Stations of East Japan Railway Company
Ichinomiya, Chiba